Survivor România 2022  is the third season of the Romanian reality competition show, Survivor România.This season was officially announced by Pro TV on November 4, 2021, with the applications being open immediately. As with the previous seasons, the season features 24 contestants divided into two tribes: "Faimoșii", composed of twelve high-achievers who excelled in their fields, and "Războinicii", composed of twelve everyday Romanians.

The season premiered on 16 January 2022 and concluded on 31 May 2022, where Alex Delea was named the winner over Elena Chiriac winning the grand prize of 100.000 € and title of Sole Survivor. It was the first season to air on Pro TV and was filmed in La Romana, Dominican Republic from January to May 2022.

The season included a twist called Exile Island. Since cycle 6, in each cycle after the first Reward Challenge of the cycle, each tribe must exile one teammate. The exiled contestants are sent to a remote location, entirely separate from the existing camps, where they will fend for themselves until last Reward Challenge of the cycle.

Production
In September 2021, it was reported that Pro TV Studios were in talks with Acun Medya, who own the rights to Survivor România, to revive the show in 2022. On 12 October 2021, Pro TV aired a teaser trailer, officially confirming that the series would return for a new series in 2022 on Pro TV. Filming began in January 2022.

It was initially broadcast from January 16 to May 21, 2022 on Pro TV and the Voyo.

Contestants
The Faimoșii tribe was announced by Pro TV on December 13, 2021. Notable cast included former professional mixed martial artist, kickboxer and boxer Cătălin Zmărăndescu, former professional football player Robert Niță, Laura Giurcanu, the winner of Season 2 of Next Top Model and Emil Rengle the winner of Season 8 of Românii au talent. The Războinicii tribe was announced by Pro TV on January 10, 2022. Notable cast included Blaze, vlogger and finalist of Season 3 of Mireasa and Elena Matei, finalist of Season 9 of Chefi la Cuțite. 
Six contestants were added later in the game in both tribes, including Marian Drăgulescu, multiple world champion and Olympic medalist in artistic gymnastics.

Season summary
Episodes air three days a week. First episode is dedicated to Reward Challenge and Mini games, the other one is dedicated to the Immunity Challenge, Tribal Council, along with the Individual Immunity Challenge for the losing tribe. The last episode of each week is dedicated to second Reward Challenge and Tribal Council that decides who gets eliminated.

Voting history

References

External links

Television shows filmed in the Dominican Republic
2022 Romanian television seasons
Romania